Gáston Begue (born 3 September 1972) is an Argentine alpine skier. He competed at the 1992 Winter Olympics and the 1994 Winter Olympics.

References

1972 births
Living people
Argentine male alpine skiers
Olympic alpine skiers of Argentina
Alpine skiers at the 1992 Winter Olympics
Alpine skiers at the 1994 Winter Olympics
People from Ushuaia